Princess Julia Lee of Korea (March 18, 1927 – November 26, 2017) was an American member of the Korean Imperial Household. She became the  wife of Gu, Prince of Korea. The two were not married in accordance with Korean custom, and thus Mullock was not included in the Lee household register. The exclusion of Mullock from the registry also means that her being a member of the Korean Imperial Household is disputed.

Early life
Born in the United States, Mullock came from a Ukrainian American family. Mullock was working in the architectural practice of IM Pei when Prince Gu, a recent graduate of MIT with a degree in architecture, joined the New York City firm. Tired of her work at IM Pei, she decided to immigrate to Spain. Mullock taped an advertisement of the notice board of her office for her apartment. Prince Gu saw the notice, visited her apartment, and instead of purchasing it, he persuaded Mullock to stay in the United States. Mullock was said to be “deeply moved” by Prince Gu when he spoke a few clumsy Ukrainian phrases he knew in an attempt to impress her.

Marriage to Prince Yi Gu
In 1958, Mullock met Prince Gu's parents, Prince Eun and Princess Bangja. In May 1958, Mullock and Prince Gu were engaged, and they married at the Ukrainian St George's Church in New York City on October 25, 1959. 

In 1963, Mullock moved to Korea with her husband. Mullock and Prince Gu moved into apartments at Changdeok Palace. As a member of the Korean Imperial Household, Mullock devoted her time to charitable endeavors in her new homeland. Mullock opened a clothing store whilst in Korea to help finance her charitable endeavors. This was a time which Mullock called "the happiest times of my life". A cousin-in-law of Mullock said “Mullock fulfilled her duty as a princess of Korea’s last royal family, helping the needy and poor, particularly the handicapped people." Mullock continued her charitable activities for many years after the end of her marriage. 

Though unable to have children with Prince Gu, Mullock did adopt a daughter with her husband, Eugenia Unsuk Lee in 1969. Their adoptive daughter was born in 1959 in Seoul. Eugenia Unsuk Lee was never formally recognized by the Lee Family Council and therefore her being a member of the Korean Imperial Household is disputed.

Prince Gu divorced Mullock in 1982 under pressure from the imperial family, as she had produced no heir. Mullock being an official member of the Korean Imperial Household is disputed, this is due to her discovery of her exclusion from the register of the Lee Family Council. Her exclusion became known to her when in the process of finalizing her divorce from Prince Gu in the United States.

In 1995, Mullock left Korea for Hawaii. On May 1, 2005, she attended religious ceremonies at the Royal Ancestors' Shrine (Jongmyo Jerye) with Mrs Gwon Heesun, her lady-in-waiting, and Princess Lee Haewon, a daughter of Prince Gang of Korea.

Prince Gu, her former husband, who divided his time between Japan, where he worked, and his homeland of Korea, died of a heart attack in 2005. 

Mullock passed away at Hale Nani Rehabilitation & Nursing Center in Honolulu, Hawaii on November 26, 2017. Mullock was survived by her adoptive daughter, Eugenia Unsuk Lee who continues to live in Hawaii.

In popular culture
 In April 2006, the Universal Studios division Focus Features announced that it would be producing a biographical film of Mullock with a working title of The Julia Project in partnership with South Korean LJ Film.  In August 2006 Focus announced that Deepa Mehta had been chosen to direct the film.

See also
Rulers of Korea
Korea under Japanese rule

References

External links
Digital Chosunilbo — English edition

1927 births
2017 deaths
House of Yi
People from Pennsylvania
American people of Ukrainian descent
American expatriates in South Korea
Princesses by marriage